Theatre Row may refer to:
 Theatre Row (New York City)
Theatre Row Building - a theatre complex in the New York neighborhood
 Hollywood Theatre Row